The 1942 Wisła Kraków season was the 21st season of Polish football club Wisła Kraków.

Only two matches were played due to World War II.

Friendlies

External links
1942 Wisła Kraków season at historiawisly.pl

Wisła Kraków seasons
Association football clubs 1942 season
Wisla